Penha is a municipality in Santa Catarina, Brazil. It had a population of 33,284 and an area of 57.752km² as of 2020. 

Its two largest attractions are its beaches and Beto Carrero World, the largest theme park in Latin America.

Aquiles da Costa is the Mayor of Penha exercising his second consecutive term in the executive office. Maria Juraci Alexandrino is the Vice-Mayor, exercising her first term in the executive office.

Penha was established on July 19th, 1958 as an emancipated city.

Penha has about 19 beaches and 31 kilometers of coastline. In 2022, the Blue Flag Program confirmed that the city kept three of its beaches in the international environmental quality certification: Bacia da Vovó, Praia da Saudade and Praia Grande will have the flag raised

See also
List of municipalities in Santa Catarina

External links
 Official website

References

Municipalities in Santa Catarina (state)
Populated coastal places in Santa Catarina (state)
Seaside resorts in Brazil